Valsesia may refer to:

 Valsesia, group of valleys in the north-east of Piedmont, Italy
 Fabio Valsesia (born 1981), Italian former soccer player
 Parco naturale Alta Valsesia, nature reserve\regional park in Piedmont, in Italy